Vyacheslav Yuryevich Volkov (born 9 November 1970) is a Russian professional football coach and a former player. He works as an assistant manager with FC Pskov-747.

Career
Volkov began playing football with local side FC Mashinostroitel Pskov. He spent most of his career playing the Russian Second Division, but had spells in the Russian First Division with FC Chernomorets Novorossiysk and FC Arsenal Tula.

He is the father of Vladislav Volkov.

References

External links
 

1970 births
Sportspeople from Pskov
Living people
Soviet footballers
Russian footballers
Russian Premier League players
FC Chernomorets Novorossiysk players
Russian football managers
FC Arsenal Tula players
Association football defenders
FC Dynamo Vologda players